The Tour of Tasmania is a cycling road race contested annually in Tasmania, Australia. Created in 1996, the race formed part of the calendar of the Union Cycliste International from 1997 to 2002. The race was not contested the 2001, 2003 and 2004, it reappeared in 2005, but was not integrated with the UCI Oceania Tour. The 2020 edition was cancelled due to the COVID-19 pandemic.

There have been several different previously-contested races since 1930, antecedents of the current Tour of Tasmania.

Winners

Original Tour of Tasmania
 1930  Hubert Opperman
 1933  Richard Lamb
 1934  Richard Lamb

The Mercury Tour of Tasmania

 1954  Reginald Arnold
 1955  
 1956  Eddie Smith
 1957  Russell Mockridge
 1958  Peter Panton
 1959  Peter Panton
 1960  John O'Sullivan
 1961  Ronald Murray
 1962  Ronald Murray
 1963  Peter Panton

The Examiner Tour of the North

 1954  Colin McKay 
 1955  Neil Geraghty 
 1956  Jim Nevin 
 1957–1959 no contested
 1960  Colin Hymus 
 1961  Allan Grindal 
 1962  Vic Brown 
 1963  Vic Brown 
 1964  Malcolm Powell 
 1965  Ray Bilney 
 1966  Don Wilson 
 1967  
 1968  Kevin Morgan 
 1969  Kerry Wood 
 1970  Donald Allan 
 1971  Russell Tankard 
 1972  Donald Allan 
 1973  
 1974  Remo Sansonetti 
 1975  Remo Sansonetti 
 1976  Remo Sansonetti 
 1977  Gary Sutton 
 1978  Michael Wilson 
 1979  John Trevorrow
 1980  Geoff Skaines 
 1981  Murray Hall 
 1982  Wayne Dellar 
 1983  Wayne Hildred 
 1984  
 1985  Michael Lynch
 1986  Stephen Hodge
 1987 Barney St. George 
 1988  Kevetoslav Pavlov
 1989 No contested
 1990  
 1991  Grant Rice

Current Tour Of Tasmania

Women's Tour Of Tasmania

References

External links 
 Official website
 Tour of Tasmania at memoire-du-cyclisme.eu
 Tour of Tasmania at Sitiodeciclismo.net
 Tour of Tasmania at Autobus.cyclingnews.com
 Tour of the North at Museociclismo.it

Cycle races in Australia
Sports competitions in Tasmania
1996 establishments in Australia
Cycling in Tasmania